Flight Lieutenant Maurice Arthur Leon Balasse (27 June 1914 – 23 January 1945) was a Belgian military pilot and flying ace who served in the British Royal Air Force (RAF) during the Second World War. He shot down six V-1 flying bombs in 1944 before he was shot down and killed over Germany early the following year.

Bibliography

References

1914 births
1945 deaths
Belgian Royal Air Force personnel of World War II
Royal Air Force officers
Belgian World War II flying aces
Aviators killed by being shot down
Belgian Air Component officers
Belgian World War II pilots
Royal Air Force personnel killed in World War II
Royal Air Force Volunteer Reserve personnel of World War II